Mestel is a surname. Notable people with the surname include: 

A. L. Mestel (1926–2022), American pediatric surgeon and artist
Jonathan Mestel (born 1957), British mathematician and chess player
Leon Mestel (1927–2017), British-Australian astronomer
Solomon Mestel (1886–1966), Ukrainian-born British-Australian rabbi